Lac de Melu is a lake in Corsica, France. The lake is the source of the Restonica River.

It is close to Lac de Capitellu, in the commune of Corte.

A new bacterial species, Polynucleobacter meluiroseus, was discovered in the lake and also named after the lake.

References

Lakes of Haute-Corse
Melu